Shadows in the Banquet Hall is Carbon Leaf's second album. It was released in 1997 by the band's own label, Constant Ivy Records.

Track listing
"Wolftrap and Fireflies" – 4:12
"Attica's Flower Box Window" – 4:40
"Come Again?" – 3:42
"Flood" – 5:21
"Reunion Monticello" – 3:53
"November (Makebelieve)" – 5:38
"Summer Song" – 4:05
"Blind Session Eye" – 6:07
"Message to Me" – 4:04
"For the Girl" – 7:45
"Dusk" – 3:02

Release
A video was made for "Flood" that won first place for an Unsigned Music Video in the Internet Underground Music Archive.

References

1997 albums
Carbon Leaf albums